Dhanora is a Village and a tehsil in Gadchiroli district in the Indian state of Maharashtra.

Geography
It has an average elevation of 230 metres (757 feet).

It is part of Gadchiroli Sub-division of Gadchiroli district along with Gadchiroli, Mulchera and Chamorshi tehsils.

References

Cities and towns in Gadchiroli district
Talukas in Maharashtra